The 1933 Centenary Gentlemen football team represented the Centenary College of Louisiana during the 1933 college football season. Paul Geisler was a consensus All-American.

Schedule

References	

Centenary
Centenary Gentlemen football seasons
College football undefeated seasons
Centenary Gentlemen football